The 1982 Japan Open Tennis Championships was a combined men's and women's tennis tournament played on outdoor hard courts in Tokyo, Japan that was part of the 1982 Avon Championships World Championship Series and the 1982 Volvo Grand Prix. The tournament was held from 18 October through 24 October 1982. Jimmy Arias and Laura Arraya won the singles titles.

Finals

Men's singles
 Jimmy Arias defeated  Dominique Bedel 6–2, 2–6, 6–4
 It was Arias' 1st singles title of his career.

Women's singles
 Laura Arraya defeated  Pilar Vásquez 3–6, 6–4, 6–0
 It was Arraya's 1st singles title of her career.

Men's doubles
 Ferdi Taygan /  Sherwood Stewart defeated  Tim Gullikson /  Tom Gullikson 6–1, 3–6, 7–6

Women's doubles
 Laura duPont /  Barbara Jordan defeated  Naoko Sato /  Brenda Remilton 6–2, 6–7, 6–1
 It was duPont's 1st doubles title of the year and the 4th of her career. It was Jordan' 1st doubles title of her career.

References

External links
 Official website
  Association of Tennis Professionals (ATP) tournament profile

Japan Open (tennis)
Japan Open Tennis Championships
Japan Open Tennis Championships
Japan Open Tennis Championships